William Jarrett may refer to:
 William Paul Jarrett, delegate to the U.S. House of Representatives from Hawaii Territory
 William Fleming Hoggan Jarrett, British pathologist
 William Joseph Jarrett, British politician and trade unionist